Allanwatsonia is a monotypic tiger moth genus in the family Erebidae erected by Douglas C. Ferguson in 1985. Its only species, Allanwatsonia hodeva, was first described by Herbert Druce in 1897. It is found in Mexico.

References

Spilosomina
Monotypic moth genera
Moths of Central America